WASET or Waset May refer to:

 Waset, a former name of Thebes, Egypt
 Waset, the fourth Upper Egyptian nome, the region of Ancient Egypt to which Thebes belonged.
 World Academy of Science, Engineering and Technology (WASET), a predatory publisher

Waset means (the city of the Scepter)